Cognitive Psychology is a peer-reviewed scientific journal covering cognitive psychology. It was established in 1970 and is published eight times per year by Elsevier. The editor-in-chief is Caren Rotello (University of Massachusetts Amherst).  Gordon Logan (Vanderbilt University) was the editor-in-chief from 1999 through 2021. According to the Journal Citation Reports, the journal has a 2015 impact factor of 4.537.

References

External links

Elsevier academic journals
Cognitive science journals
Publications established in 1970
English-language journals